Middleton Municipal Airport , also known as Morey Field, is a general aviation airport located  northwest of Middleton, a city in Dane County, Wisconsin, United States. It is included in the Federal Aviation Administration (FAA) National Plan of Integrated Airport Systems for 2021–2025, in which it is categorized as a regional general aviation facility.

History 
Morey Field was named after founder Howard Morey who started the Middleton airport in 1942. Management of the airport changed hands to Field Morey, the son of Howard and then to Richard Morey, the son of Field. The airport was sold to the city of Middleton in 1998, and its name was changed from Morey Field to Middleton Municipal Airport – Morey Field. Although the airport was sold to the city, Richard Morey still manages the FBO which provides services to airport users.

In July 2005 the city of Middleton completed a $7 million renovation of the airport including land acquisition and construction.

Morey Airplane Co. is the airport's fixed-base operator.

Facilities and aircraft 

 10/28: , surface: asphalt
 1/19: , surface: turf 

This airport is served by the following instrument approach procedures:

RNAV (GPS) RWY 10
RNAV (GPS) RWY 28
LOC/DME RWY 10
VOR RWY 28

Note: Special take-off minimums apply.

For the 12-month period ending July 16, 2020, the airport had 40,510 aircraft operations, an average of 111 per day: 62% local general aviation, 32% transient general aviation, 6% air taxi and less than 1% military. 

In January 2023, there were 94 aircraft based at this airport: 83 single-engine, 5 multi-engine, 2 jet and 4 helicopter.

Cargo operations

See also 
 List of airports in Wisconsin

References

External links 
 Morey Airplane Co.
 Wisconsin Airport Directory: Middleton Municipal – Morey Field (PDF)

Airports in Wisconsin
Buildings and structures in Dane County, Wisconsin
Airports established in 1942
1942 establishments in Wisconsin